The Pioneers is the debut collaboration album by American rappers MC Eiht and Spice 1. The album was released June 29, 2004, on Real Talk Entertainment. It peaked at number 71 on the Billboard Top R&B/Hip-Hop Albums. Spice 1 and MC Eiht also produced a second album together for Real Talk Entertainment, titled Keep It Gangsta, released in 2006.

Track listing
"Break Deez Mu'fuckaz"- 0:10 
"The Murder Show, Pt. 2"- 3:54 
"So Damn Crazy"- 4:08 produced by Dj Epik , Goldfingaz
"Come on Niggaz" Snoop Dogg - 0:15 
"We Run the Block"- 4:41 produced by Mark knoxx & Goldfingaz 
"That's It"- 3:44 produced by Mark knoxx & Dj Epik 
"Can't Stop Us"- 3:44  produced by Goldfingaz& Mark Knoxx
"That's the Way Life Goes"- 4:35 produced by  Dj Epik, Goldfingaz&Mark Knoxx
"East Bay Gangsta" - 3:24 produced  Warrington Richardson 
"All I Came 2 Do" - 3:35 produced by Mark Knoxx 
"'Bout That Time"- 4:08 produced by Fireworks productions 
"Do Better"- 5:03 produced by Goldfingaz & Dj Epik 
"Been a Long Time"- 4:29 Produced by Goldfingaz
"West Coast Party" feat. Hollow Tip- 4:04 produced by Goldfingaz
"Keepin' Me High" - 4:18 produced by Mark Knoxx 
"I Ain't Scared"- 3:18 dj Epik 
"The Mack" (Bonus Track) - 4:37 Produced by Dj Epik

Charts

References

External links
 The Pioneers at Discogs

MC Eiht albums
Spice 1 albums
2004 albums
Real Talk Entertainment albums
Collaborative albums